Taliqu was Khan of the Chagatai Khanate (1308–1309). He was the son of Qadaqchi and a princess of Kerman, and a grandson of Büri.

Following the death of Könchek, Taliqu seized power and became Khan. As a Muslim, he attempted to convert his subjects to Islam; this move was unpopular. This, combined with resentment that he was not a descendant of Duwa, led to a revolt against his rule. His enemies selected Duwa's son Kebek to become Khan, and defeated Taliqu in battle in 1309. His supporters joined the forces of Kebek, and were instrumental in defeating the sons of Kaidu that same year.

Chagatai khans
Mongol Empire Muslims
Converts to Islam
14th-century monarchs in Asia
Year of death unknown
Year of birth unknown